Nansi Lake, or Weishan Lake, administrated by Weishan County and located in Shandong Province in China, is the largest freshwater lake in the north of the country. It consists of four connected lakes: Weishan, Zhaoyang, Nanyang, Dushan.  It is 120 km long and 1266 square km in area.

References

 http://english.people.com.cn/200212/27/eng20021227_109168.shtml

External links
Water Resource Administration of Lake Nansi a

Lakes of China
Bodies of water of Shandong
Ramsar sites in China